George Dillwyn Carter (September 18, 1867 – July 15, 1951) was an American politician who served in the Virginia House of Delegates.

References

External links 

1867 births
1951 deaths
Democratic Party members of the Virginia House of Delegates
19th-century American politicians